This is a list of diplomatic missions of Cyprus. Cyprus has a modest diplomatic presence. Northern Cyprus has its own diplomatic missions, albeit only to Turkey, the sole country that recognizes the Turkish Republic of Northern Cyprus. The Republic of Cyprus itself does not have a diplomatic presence in Turkey.

Listed below are Cypriot embassies/high commissions and consulates general (excluding honorary consulates):

Africa

 Cairo (Embassy)

 Pretoria (High Commission)

Americas

 Brasília (Embassy)

 Ottawa (High Commission)

 Havana (Embassy)

 Washington, D.C. (Embassy)
 New York City (Consulate-General)

Asia

 Beijing (Embassy)

 New Delhi (High Commission)

 Tehran (Embassy)

 Tel Aviv (Embassy)

 Tokyo (Embassy)

 Amman (Embassy)

 Kuwait City (Embassy)

 Beirut (Embassy)

 Muscat (Embassy)

 Ramallah (Representative Office)

 Doha (Embassy)

 Riyadh (Embassy)

 Damascus (Embassy)

 Abu Dhabi (Embassy)

Europe

 Vienna (Embassy)

 Sofia (Embassy)

 Prague (Embassy)

 Copenhagen (Embassy)

 Helsinki (Embassy)

 Paris (Embassy)

 Berlin (Embassy)
 Hamburg (Consulate-General)

 Athens (Embassy)
 Thessaloniki (Consulate-General)

 Rome (Embassy)

 Budapest (Embassy)

 Dublin (Embassy)

 Rome (Embassy)

 The Hague (Embassy)

 Warsaw (Embassy)

 Lisbon (Embassy)

 Bucharest (Embassy)

 Moscow (Embassy)
 Krasnodar (Consulate-General)
 Saint Petersburg (Consulate-General)
 Samara (Consulate-General)
 Yekaterinburg (Consulate-General)

 Belgrade (Embassy)

 Bratislava (Embassy)

 Madrid (Embassy)

 Stockholm (Embassy)

 Kyiv (Embassy)

 London (High Commission)

Oceania

 Canberra (High Commission)

Multilateral organizations
 
Strasbourg (Permanent Mission)
 
Brussels (Permanent Missions)
  Food and Agriculture Organization
Rome (Permanent Mission)
 
New York City (Permanent Mission)
Geneva (Permanent Mission)
Vienna (Permanent Mission)

Gallery

See also 
 Foreign relations of Cyprus

Notes

References 

 Ministry of Foreign Affairs of Cyprus

 
Diplomatic missions
Cyprus